The OpenStreetMap Foundation (abbreviated OSMF) is a non-profit foundation whose aim is to support and enable the development of freely-reusable geospatial data. Founded in 2006, it is closely connected with the OpenStreetMap project, although its constitution does not prevent it supporting other projects.

History 

The OpenStreetMap Foundation was registered in England and Wales on 22 August 2006 as a company limited by guarantee. In 2007, it held the first State of the Map conference in Manchester.

In October 2009, the foundation announced that its members, rather than the OpenStreetMap contributors at large, would vote on changing OpenStreetMap's data license from Creative Commons Attribution-ShareAlike to the Open Database License.

In September 2013, the foundation began accepting corporate memberships in an "associate member" (nonvoting) category. The initial corporate members were Geofabrik, Geotab, Naver, NextGIS, and Mapbox.

In June 2021, the foundation stated that the effects of Brexit have prompted them to consider a move back into the European Union due to issues with database rights, difficulties with getting charitable status for the foundation, and the increasing difficulty of using PayPal and banking in the United Kingdom. The foundation has not announced the location of its new headquarters.

Governance 
The OpenStreetMap Foundation is a membership organization. Membership in the foundation is separate from a user account on the OpenStreetMap website: a user account is required to contribute to the map, while foundation membership entitles one to vote at a general meeting.

The foundation is run by a board of seven members, including the foundation's officers: chairman, secretary and treasurer. The board is elected by the foundation's dues-paying members. , the board consists of Guillaume Rischard (Chairperson), Mikel Maron (Secretary), Roland Olbricht (Treasurer), Sarah Hoffmann, Mateusz Konieczny, Arnalie Vicario, and Craig Allan.

Several working groups, composed mostly of volunteers, carry out day-to-day operations on behalf of the foundation:

 Data Working Group countervandalism and dispute resolution
 Communication Working Group
 Engineering Working Group
 Legal or Licensing Working Group trademark and licensing issues
 Local Chapters Working Group
 Membership Working Group
 Operations Working Group
 State of the Map Organizing Committee

Several local chapters are affiliated with the OpenStreetMap Foundation.

Programs and initiatives 

The OpenStreetMap Foundation promotes and supports the OpenStreetMap project but does not formally own the project or its contents. The foundation's relatively low profile in OpenStreetMap's development has been contrasted with the Wikimedia Foundation's relationship to Wikipedia.

In addition to day-to-day operations within the OpenStreetMap project, the foundation and its working groups run several initiatives to promote the project's growth. Its annual State of the Map conference is the flagship conference within the OpenStreetMap community. The GPStogo program lends GPS receivers to mappers in developing countries.

Notable people 
 Steve Coast former board chairman emeritus; founder of OpenStreetMap
 Allan Mustard former board member; retired U.S. ambassador

See also 
 Open Knowledge Foundation

References

External links 

 

2006 establishments in England
Companies based in the West Midlands (county)
Free software project foundations
International geographic data and information organizations
Open content
OpenStreetMap
Organizations established in 2006
Private companies limited by guarantee of England
Sutton Coldfield